Three Friends is a 1913 American short silent Western film directed by D. W. Griffith and starring Blanche Sweet.

Cast

See also
 Harry Carey filmography
 D. W. Griffith filmography
 Blanche Sweet filmography
 Lionel Barrymore filmography

References

External links
 

1913 films
1913 Western (genre) films
1913 short films
American silent short films
American black-and-white films
Biograph Company films
Films directed by D. W. Griffith
Silent American Western (genre) films
1910s American films